Eric I, Duke of Mecklenburg (after 1359, probably in 136526 July 1397) was a Duke of Mecklenburg and heir to the throne of Sweden.

Life
Eric was the eldest son of Albert, King of Sweden, and Queen Richardis, a daughter of Count Otto I of Schwerin.

He was married on 12 or 13 February 1396 to Sophie, the daughter of Duke Bogislaw VI of Pomerania-Wolgast. They had no children.

Eric's father attempted to consolidate his position as King of Sweden in 1364 and again in 1386. Queen Margaret I of Denmark intervened and defeated Albert in the battle of Åsle, in the vicinity of Falköping, in 1389. Albert and Eric were captured during this battle. They were released in 1395 after three years of negotiations involving Hinrich Westhof and Johann Niebur, the mayors of Lübeck.

Later that year, Albert tasked Eric with the reconquest of Gotland. In the summer of 1396, Eric landed on the island with an army and in the spring of 1397, he defeated Sven Sture, who then had to swear allegiance to Albert III. Also in 1397, the kingdoms of Denmark, Norway and Sweden were united into the Kalmar Union, which cemented the position of Queen Margaret I.

Duke Eric (as he was called) died of the plague in 1397 on his estate called Landeskrone or Kronvall in Klintehamn south of Visby (in Gotland). He was buried in St. Mary's Church, also known as Visby Cathedral, where part of his original gravestone is on display.

References and sources 
 Jörgen Bracker: Klaus Störtebeker – Nur einer von ihnen. Die Geschichte der Vitalienbrüder, in: Ralf Wiechmann: Klaus Störtebecker: ein Mythos wird entschlüsselt, Fink, Paderborn/München, 2003, pp. 9–59
 Matthias Puhle: Die Vitalienbrüder: Klaus Stortebeker und die Seeräuber der Hansezeit, 2d ed., Campus Verlag, Frankfurt am Main, 1994,

External links 

 Genealogical table of the House of Mecklenburg
 Eric I at www.emecklenburg.de

Sources 

Dukes of Mecklenburg
1360s births
Year of birth uncertain
1397 deaths
14th-century German nobility
14th-century deaths from plague (disease)
Swedish princes
People from Gotland
Sons of kings